Sabrina Conce Fiore Canata Morinigo (born 17 April 1996) is a Paraguayan handball player for UnC Concórdia and the Paraguay national team.

She represented Paraguay at the 2013 World Women's Handball Championship in Serbia, where the Paraguayan team placed 21st.

Titles
Super Globe:
2019: 
South and Central America Women's Club Handball Championship:
2019
Brazilian Handball League:
2017,2018

Individual Awards
2017 Pan American Women's Handball Championship: Top scorer

References

Paraguayan female handball players
1996 births
Living people
Expatriate handball players
Paraguayan expatriate sportspeople in Brazil